Markku Kuismin (born 26 April 1960) is a Finnish sailor. He competed in the Tornado event at the 1992 Summer Olympics.

References

External links
 

1960 births
Living people
Finnish male sailors (sport)
Olympic sailors of Finland
Sailors at the 1992 Summer Olympics – Tornado
Sportspeople from Helsinki